Rebecca Emma Gisela Hudson (born 13 June 1979 in Doncaster, England) is an English professional golfer who plays on the Ladies European Tour.

Amateur career
Hudson had a very successful junior and amateur career. She was Yorkshire Girls Champion in 1994, Yorkshire Champion 1995,1997 and 1998, English Girls Champion in 1995 and 1996 and won the Daily Telegraph Junior Golfer of the Year Award in 1994, 1995 and 1997. She also won the Joyce Wethered Award for the young player making the best effort at combining top level golf with education.

She was 1997 French under-21 champion, 2000 Spanish Ladies Amateur champion, 2000 Scottish strokeplay champion, 2000 English Women's Strokeplay champion, 2000 and 2002 British Ladies Amateur champion, 2000 British Amateur strokeplay champion and 2000 English strokeplay champion. In 2001, she won the English Women's Amateur Championship, was British Amateur strokeplay champion and winner of Smyth Salver for leading amateur at the Weetabix Women's British Open.

She won the 2000 Daily Telegraph Women's Golfer of the Year award, was a member of the Great Britain & Ireland Curtis Cup team in 1998, 2000 and 2002, and was a member of the Great Britain & Ireland 2000 Espirito Santo Trophy World Amateur Team Championship team.

Professional career
Hudson turned professional in September 2002 and joined the Ladies European Tour with conditional status in 2003. She gained her first professional win at the 2006 Acer Women's SA Open on the Ladies African Tour, and won the 2006 Ladies African Tour Order of Merit. She won her first Ladies European Tour title at the Ladies Central European Open in 2006.

Hudson gained her second Ladies European Tour victory at the Euro 300,000 Tenerife Ladies Open 19–22 June 2008 and then her third at English Open at the Oxfordshire Golf Club the week after. She ended the season 10th on the New Star Money list, (the LET's official order of merit).

Also in 2008 she won the European Team Championship for England partnered with Trish Johnson.

Professional wins

Ladies European Tour wins
2006 OTP Bank Ladies Central European Open
2008 Tenerife Ladies Open, Oxfordshire Ladies English Open, VCI European Ladies Golf Cup (with Trish Johnson)

Other wins
2006 Acer SA Women's Open

Team appearances
Amateur
European Ladies' Team Championship (representing England): 1997, 1999, 2001
Vagliano Trophy (representing Great Britain & Ireland): 1997, 2001
Curtis Cup (representing Great Britain & Ireland): 1998, 2000, 2002
Espirito Santo Trophy (representing Great Britain & Ireland): 2000
Commonwealth Trophy (representing Great Britain): 1999

References

External links

English female golfers
Ladies European Tour golfers
Winners of ladies' major amateur golf championships
Sportspeople from Doncaster
1979 births
Living people